Coupeville is a town on Whidbey Island, in Island County, Washington, United States.

It is the county seat of Island County. The population was 1,831 at the 2010 census.

History
Prior to European colonization, Coupeville and the bay in which it is located, Penn Cove, was inhabited by the Lower Skagit, a Lushootseed-speaking Coast Salish people. There were three villages around the bay, with the largest being at bəc̓adᶻali, meaning "snake place", the site of present day Coupeville. There was an abundance of salmon, clams, and other resources, as well as offering easy access to the water, making it an excellent village site. 

When Europeans arrived to explore the Puget Sound, it was Joseph Whidbey who first visited the bay, naming it Penn Cove in honor of his good friend. Captain George Vancouver later wrote after meeting the Skagit at the village that their population had quickly fallen due to disease. 

Coupeville was laid out in the 1850s by Captain Thomas Coupe, and named for him. 

Coupeville was officially incorporated on April 20, 1910.

Coupeville is a historic district within the federal Ebey's Landing National Historical Reserve. The reserve was established by Congress in 1978 as the first and only National Historical Reserve in the nation.  Its  also encompass farmlands, Fort Ebey State Park, Fort Casey State Park, shorelines and beaches, parks, trails, and 91 buildings and structures on the National Register of Historic Places.

Geography
Coupeville is located at  (48.218250, -122.683556).

Climate
Coupeville experiences significantly lower rainfall than much of western Washington, due to its location within the rain shadow of the Olympic Mountains. Due to the significant drying trend in summer, Coupeville's climate is classified as warm-summer Mediterranean, according to the Köppen climate classification system.

Demographics

2010 census
As of the census of 2010, there were 1,831 people, 806 households, and 428 families living in the town. The racial makeup of the town was 87.2% White, 1.6% African American, 0.6% Native American, 1.9% Asian, 0.3% Pacific Islander, 4.2% from other races, and 4.3% from two or more races. Hispanic or Latino of any race were 9.0% of the population.

There were 806 households, of which 21.1% had children under the age of 18 living with them, 42.8% were married couples living together, 7.3% had a female householder with no husband present, 3.0% had a male householder with no wife present, and 46.9% were non-families. 40.0% of all households were made up of individuals, and 19.4% had someone living alone who was 65 years of age or older. The average household size was 2.06 and the average family size was 2.77.

The median age in the town was 51.1 years. 17.1% of residents were under the age of 18; 6.3% were between the ages of 18 and 24; 19.1% were from 25 to 44; 29.9% were from 45 to 64; and 27.5% were 65 years of age or older. The gender makeup of the town was 44.3% male and 55.7% female.

2000 census
As of the census of 2000, there were 1,723 people, 737 households, and 426 families living in the town. The population density was 1,346.7 people per square mile (519.7/km2). There were 814 housing units at an average density of 636.2 per square mile (245.5/km2). The racial makeup of the town was 89.8% White, 1.6% African American, 0.5% Native American, 2.2% Asian, 2.8% from other races, and 3.1% from two or more races. Hispanic or [Latino of any race were 5.3% of the population.

There were 737 households, out of which 25.5% had children under the age of 18 living with them, 46.0% were married couples living together, 9.1% had a female householder with no husband present, and 42.1% were non-families. 36.9% of all households were made up of individuals, and 19.4% had someone living alone who was 65 years of age or older. The average household size was 2.16 and the average family size was 2.81.

In the town, the population was spread out, with 21.1% under the age of 18, 6.0% from 18 to 24, 25.0% from 25 to 44, 22.7% from 45 to 64, and 25.2% who were 65 years of age or older. The median age was 43 years. For every 100 females, there were 83.5 males. For every 100 females age 18 and over, there were 81.2 males.

The median income for a household in the town was $33,938, and the median income for a family was $47,721. Males had a median income of $33,235 versus $27,100 for females. The per capita income for the town was $18,720. About 8.9% of families and 11.4% of the population were below the poverty line, including 14.9% of those under age 18 and 8.2% of those age 65 or over.

Economy
In 1987, 42 percent of the county's population were employed by the military.  Major employers in Coupeville are Island County and WhidbeyHealth Medical Center.

Service and retail businesses serve the island population and visitors attracted to the town's historic waterfront district and Ebey's Landing National Historical Reserve. Retail businesses are located along North and South Main Street, Coveland, and Front Street along the waterfront. In addition to 11 restaurants, cafes, and coffee shops, stores include art galleries, gourmet food, clothing, souvenir, and home decor retailers. With few exceptions, these businesses are operated by individual local owners.

Notable people
Guy Bond, psychologist.
Adrienne Lyle, Olympic dressage rider.

See also

National Register of Historic Places listings in Island County, Washington
Naval Outlying Landing Field Coupeville

References

External links

 History of Coupeville at HistoryLink
 Coupeville & Central Whidbey Island Chamber of Commerce
 Coupeville Visitors' Information
 Island County Historical Museum
 Sunnyside Cemetery - Coupeville's historic pioneer cemetery
 US National Park Service: Ebey's Landing National Historical Reserve website
 NPS: History and culture of Ebey's Landing National Historical Reserve and Central Whidbey Island
 Historic Admiralty Head Lighthouse
 Coupeville Arts & Crafts Festival
 The Whidbey Examiner newspaper, based in Coupeville
 Oliver S. Van Olinda Photography Collection - Former editor of the Island County Times a Coupeville newspaper; University of Washington Library

 
Towns in Island County, Washington
County seats in Washington (state)
Ebey's Landing National Historical Reserve
Historic districts on the National Register of Historic Places in Washington (state)
Populated places established in 1852
1852 establishments in Oregon Territory
Towns in Washington (state)
National Register of Historic Places in Island County, Washington